Shivaani Ghai (born 25 April 1975) is an English actress.

Early life
Ghai is of Indian origin and was born in Newcastle upon Tyne. She grew up in Gosforth and attended Gosforth High School. Later, she went to university, where she gained a BA in film and television studies.

Career
Ghai began her acting career in theatre in London, working for companies such as Man Mela, Rifco and Kali. She moved on to television with minor parts in shows such as Doctors, Spooks and The Bill.

In 2003, she was cast as the guest lead in an American adventure series Adventure Inc. alongside Michael Biehn. Later the same year Gurinder Chadha picked Ghai out at a script reading and cast her as the bride and best friend of Ashwarya Rai in Bride and Prejudice. After this, Ghai appeared in BBC shows such as My Hero and Sinchronicity, short films, theatre and commercials. In 2006, she was cast as Sarita Dhavi in Rai Uno's Un medico in famiglia, the popular Italian television programme, when an Indian family was added to the show. She played Sarita Dahvi, which was originally to be cast to an Italian actress of Indian descent, but one could not be found. Ghai could not speak Italian but learnt some scenes for her audition. She became part of the first Indian family on Italian television. After this, Ghai travelled to Tunisia to work on the HBO/BBC co-production House of Saddam, where she played Saddam Hussein's middle daughter Rana. The miniseries aired in September 2008.

In 2009, Ghai filmed a guest lead as Jamilla Sagar, in a series called Identity, starring Aidan Gillen and Keeley Hawes. She filmed a five-part drama called Five Days II (sequel to Bafta and Golden globe nominated Five Days). She played Nusrat Preston, a character described as being "at the heart of the serial". She was also noted in the press for standing out amongst an ensemble cast that included Suranne Jones, Anne Reid, David Morrissey, Bernard Hill, and Steve Evets. She played the part of Rena in the film Cleanskin, which starred Sean Bean and Charlotte Rampling. The film was released in 2012.

In 2012, Ghai appeared in EastEnders playing Ayesha Rana, a friend of Zainab Masood. She first appeared on 17 December 2012. She departed from the show on 1 March 2013.

In 2013, she appeared in Ambassadors as Natalia, the head of public relations. She also played the role of Batya in the History Channel's The Bible.

She was part of the main cast of the apocalyptic series Dominion. In 2016, Shivani Ghai appeared in ABC's The Catch as Felicity.

In 2019, she appeared in Strike Back: Revolution as a very wealthy Hindu entrepreneur and one of the main villains of the series.

In 2021, she landed a recurring role on Batwoman as the villain Safiyah Sohail in Season Two.

Personal life
She was married to the late British Asian playwright Parv Bancil. In 2014, she met the South African actor Ty Keogh on the set of Dominion. They married two years later.

Filmography

Film

Television

Awards and nominations

References

External links
 

Living people
1975 births
Actresses from Newcastle upon Tyne
British actresses of Indian descent
English expatriates in South Africa
English people of Indian descent
English soap opera actresses
English television actresses
People educated at Gosforth Academy